"Shake Ya Tailfeather" is a song recorded by American rappers Nelly, P. Diddy and Murphy Lee. It was released in 2003 from the Bad Boys II Soundtrack. It topped the Billboard Hot 100 singles chart, giving Nelly his third number one on the chart, Lee's first and P. Diddy's fifth, making Diddy a rapper with the most number one hits on the chart at the time, before surpassed by Drake. The song was also included on Lee's debut album, Murphy's Law. The song won the Grammy Award for Best Rap Performance by a Duo or Group at the 2004 Grammy Awards.

Track listing
US promo
 "Shake Ya Tailfeather" [Main Edit] - 4:57
 "Shake Ya Tailfeather" [Instrumental] - 4:45

Europe promo
 "Shake Ya Tailfeather" [Radio Edit] - 4:02
 "Shake Ya Tailfeather" [Album Version] - 4:57

Europe single
 "Shake Ya Tailfeather" [Radio Edit] - 4:02
 "Shake Ya Tailfeather" [Album Version] - 4:57 	
 Loon - "Relax Your Mind" - 4:19

Europe 12" vinyl
A. "Shake Ya Tailfeather" (Main)  	 	
B1. "Shake Ya Tailfeather" (Instrumental) 		
B2. "Shake Ya Tailfeather" (Single Version)

Music video
The video (directed by Benny Boom) features appearances by Esther Baxter and future June 2004 Playboy Playmate Hiromi Oshima. The song features the Florida State Seminoles/Atlanta Braves/Kansas City Chiefs Tomahawk Chop "War Chant".
The video starts with all three of them eating and talking in a dining stall.
Nelly raps the first verse and the bridge, P. Diddy raps verse two and Murphy Lee raps the third verse. In the chorus, Nelly and P. Diddy take turns rapping in each line, with the "War Chant" melody in the background. The music video premiered on July 8, 2003.

Charts

Weekly charts

Year-end charts

References

2003 songs
2003 singles
Nelly songs
Sean Combs songs
Murphy Lee songs
Songs written for films
Bad Boys (franchise)
Billboard Hot 100 number-one singles
Music videos directed by Benny Boom
Universal Records singles
Bad Boy Records singles